Barrs Chapel C.M.E. Church is a historic district at 5560 Briarpatch Lake Road in the Midway community of Henry County, Tennessee.

Contributing properties in the historic district include the Barrs Chapel Church building, constructed in 1953; Barrs Chapel School, built in 1906; and Barrs Chapel Church Cemetery, which dates to around 1870. The historic district was listed on the National Register of Historic Places in 2005.

References

External links
 Barrs Chapel CME resources, Middle Tennessee State University

Christian Methodist Episcopal churches in Tennessee
Churches on the National Register of Historic Places in Tennessee
Buildings and structures in Henry County, Tennessee
Historic districts on the National Register of Historic Places in Tennessee
National Register of Historic Places in Henry County, Tennessee